Charles "Charlie Red" Hardnett (September 13, 1938 – July 6, 2019) was an American basketball player who played three seasons in the National Basketball Association (NBA). The 6' 8" power forward played for Carver High School Atlanta. He played college basketball for Grambling State University from 1959 to 1963. Hardnett earned All-America honors in 1962. He was also the NAIA Basketball Tournament MVP in 1961. Hardnett was drafted in the third round (third pick) of the 1962 NBA draft by the St. Louis Hawks. He played for the Chicago Zephyrs / Baltimore Bullets (NBA) from 1962 to 1965. Hardnett also coached at the college level. He coached at Coppin State College (Baltimore) from 1970 to 1974, and at Morris Brown College (Atlanta) from 1974 to 1980.

High school career
Hardnett attended Carver High School in Atlanta from 1955 to 1958. While in High School, Hardnett played three sports including basketball, football, and baseball. He earned several honors as an athlete and student while at Carver, and was the only male athlete to attend and graduate college in his graduating class. His accomplishments as a high school student-athlete are as follows:

 All-City in Football – Junior(1957) and Senior (1958)
 All-City in Basketball – Junior(1957) and Senior (1958)
 All-State in Basketball – Senior (1958)
 State Tournament MVP – Senior (1958)
 Black High School All-American Team – Senior (1958)
 Member of the Baseball team for three years
 President of the student body – Senior (1958)
 The most improved student award – Senior (1958)
 Four-Year Scholarship to Grambling College

Collegiate career
Hardnett went to Grambling College in 1958, and became an instant success. He was coached by Fred Hobdy who coached at Grambling for 30 seasons. During his days at Grambling, Hardnett played with players such as Willis Reed. During his years at Grambling, Hardnett amassed the following honors:

1958–1959
 First year starter
 Led the team in rebounding

1959–1960
 Most Valuable Player – Georgia Invitational Tournament, Atlanta
 NAIA All-American Team
 Selected to the NAIA All-Stars that participated in the 1960 Olympic Trials Beat Ohio State (1960 NCAA Champions) in the first round
 First Team All-SWAC

1960–1961
 NAIA All-American
 NAIA Tournament MVP
 NAIA All-Tournament Team
 Basketball Player of the year award – 100% Tip-Off Club Atlanta
 Chuck Taylor All-American Second Team  Only small college player selected
 First Team All-SWAC
 NAIA Basketball Championship 2nd HBCU to win the event (Only National Championship for Grambling)

1961–62
 NAIA All-American Team
 Chuck Taylor All-American First TeamOnly small college player selected
 First Team All-SWAC

Hardnett scored over 2,000 points in his career at Grambling and grabbed over 2,000 rebounds (16.9 RPG—First All-Time at Grambling). In addition, Hardnett was drafted by the NBA and became the First African-American drafted by the NBA from the state of Georgia, the second Player drafted by the NBA from Grambling, and only the third African-American drafted by the NBA from an HBCU in the state of Louisiana. In 1973, Hardnett was elected to the NAIA Hall of Fame as an athlete.

2009
 Inducted into the Grambling Legends Sports Hall of Fame at the inaugural induction ceremony July 18, 2009, Monroe, Louisiana.

The inaugural induction class includes Willis Reed (Basketball), Tommy Agee (Baseball), Ernie Ladd (Football/Wrestling), Henry Dyer (Football), Ralph Garr (Baseball), Charlie Hardnett (Basketball), Robert Hopkins (Basketball), Lane Howell (Football), Stone Johnson (Football/Track), Willie Joseph (Football), Legolian "Boots" Moore (Football), Bo Murray (Football), Helen Richards-Smith (Basketball), Richard Stebbins (Track), Hershell West (Basketball), Willie Young (Football), Tank Younger (Football), Ralph W.E. Jones (College President and Coach), Eddie Robinson (Coach), Collie Nicholson (Sports Information Officer), Fred C. Hobdy (Coach), Willie Brown (Football), Buck Buchanan (Football), Willie Davis (Football) and Charlie Joiner (Football).

2012
 NAIA 75th Anniversary Team at NAIA Championship Kansas City, Missouri.

2015
 Inducted into the Coppin State University Hall of Fame February 2015, Baltimore.
 Inducted into the Carver High School Hall of Fame April 2015, Atlanta.

Professional career

Hardnett's professional basketball career started by being drafted by the St. Louis Hawks in the 3rd round of the 1962 NBA draft. He played in Chicago for the Zephyrs and in Baltimore for the Bullets. After the NBA, Hardnett went on to play in the CBA Eastern League. He played three more years of professional basketball for the Harrisburg Patriots and the Scranton Miners.

Coaching career

After a successful playing career, Hardnett entered a career of coaching. His coaching career would have him serve as the Head Basketball Coach at Coppin State in Baltimore and at Morris Brown College in Atlanta. During his career at Morris Brown College he served quadruple duties as the Head Basketball Coach, Athletic Director, Head Baseball Coach, and Head Golf Coach. He coached for 12 years and amassed a 160–150 coaching record. During his coaching career, Hardnett had the following highlights:

 Won 2 Regular Season Championships 1972, 1973
 Won 1 Conference Tournament Championship 1974
 Finished 3rd in Conference Tournament twice (??, ??)
 Took Coppin State to NAIA District 19 Playoffs twice (??, ??)
 Players for Charles Hardnett - 1 Player Drafted by the NBA (Name and Year) - 7 Players on All-Conference Teams (Names and Years)- 3 Players on All-Tournament Teams (Names and Years)
 Named the Coach of the Year twice (team years)
 Named Atlanta University Coach of the Year in 1980, Presented at Extra Point Club, Inc. of Atlanta

Family
Charles Hardnett was married to Bernice Hardnett, and lived in Louisville, Kentucky. He and his wife had three children: Dana S. Hardnett, Charles R. Hardnett (married to Felicia A. Hardnett), and Derek W. Hardnett (married to Quovardis Hardnett). He and his wife had several grandchildren: Daveon, Wendy, William, Derek, Jeremy, Erin, and Charles Jr. (CJ).

Hardnett died on July 6, 2019.

Honors
In 1973, Hardnett was elected to the NAIA Hall of Fame as an athlete.
In 2009, Inducted into the Grambling Legends Sports Hall of Fame at the inaugural induction ceremony July 18, 2009, Monroe, Louisiana.
2012, NAIA 75th Anniversary Team at NAIA Championship Kansas City, Missouri.
In 2015, Hardnett was inducted into the Coppin State University Hall of Fame.

See also
 NAIA Basketball Tournament Most Valuable Player

References

External links

1938 births
2019 deaths
20th-century African-American sportspeople
21st-century African-American people
American men's basketball players
African-American basketball players
Baltimore Bullets (1963–1973) players
Basketball coaches from Georgia (U.S. state)
Basketball players from Atlanta
Centers (basketball)
Chicago Zephyrs players
Coppin State Eagles men's basketball coaches
Grambling State Tigers men's basketball players
Harrisburg Patriots players
Morris Brown Wolverines men's basketball coaches
Power forwards (basketball)
St. Louis Hawks draft picks